The Case Died with Her is an American television special that aired December 6, 2020, on Oxygen, directed by Skye Borgman. The program tells the story of Emilie Morris, a former star high school athlete, who was found dead in 2014 at her apartment just after bringing charges against Jim Wilder for inappropriate behavior when she was a minor.

References

External links
 
 

2020 American television episodes
2020s American television specials
Oxygen (TV channel) original programming